The Armsel Striker, also known as the Sentinel Arms Co Striker-12, Protecta, Protecta Bulldog and SWD Street Sweeper is a 12-gauge shotgun with a revolving cylinder that was designed for riot control and combat.

History
The Armsel Striker was designed by Hilton R. Walker, a Zimbabwean citizen, in 1981. Walker subsequently emigrated to South Africa, bringing with him the design for the Striker shotgun. His shotgun became a success and was exported to various parts of the world, despite some drawbacks. The rotary cylinder-type magazine was bulky, had a long reload time, and the basic action was not without certain flaws.

Walker redesigned his weapon in 1989, removing the cylinder rotation mechanism, and adding an auto cartridge ejection system. The new shotgun was named the Protecta.

A copy of the Striker was made by the US gunmaker Cobray and marketed as the SWD Street Sweeper from 1989 through 1993.

Design and features
The weapon's action is similar to a revolver's, using a rotating cylinder. Since the Striker uses a conventional double action only trigger and a very large and heavy cylinder (compared to handguns), Walker added a pre-wound clock-work spring to revolve the magazine. This made loading slow, in exchange for a shorter and lighter trigger pull. The design was changed into having a cocking lever on the right side of the barrel.

The first designs were criticized as having a slow and cumbersome firing mechanism. The shells had to be individually loaded and then the drum's clockwork spring wound. Shells were ejected by an ejector rod along the right hand side of the barrel. The last version has the clockwork winding mechanism removed, the ejector rod replaced by an automatic ejection system, and a cocking lever in the rod's place that winds the drum automatically. The Striker has a twelve-round magazine capacity and short overall length. Compact variants hold 7 rounds.

Availability in the United States
The Striker and Street Sweeper were declared destructive devices under the National Firearms Act with no sporting purpose by Treasury Secretary Lloyd Bentsen in 1994, and their transfer and ownership is regulated by the Bureau of Alcohol, Tobacco, Firearms and Explosives (ATF).

Variants
Armsel Striker—Hilton Walker's first design.
Armsel Protecta—An improved version of the Armsel Striker. Readying the weapon for firing was simplified and the weapon's reliability was improved.
Armsel Protecta Bulldog—An extremely shortened, stockless version of the Armsel Protecta. It is intended for building entry and vehicular duties.
Sentinel Arms Striker-12—A fully licensed and improved copy of the Armsel Striker for the American market made by Sentinel Arms Co. It was available with an 18-inch barrel and a 7-inch stockless version.
Cobray/SWD Street Sweeper—A lower-end clone of the Armsel Striker, having a limited parts commonality to the original weapons system.
Cobray/SWD Ladies Home Companion/ LHC—A reduced caliber version of the Streetsweeper. The trigger group is attached to a .410 bore or .45/70 Government drum and barrel.

See also

Automatic shotgun
Combat shotgun
List of combat shotguns
List of shotguns
Riot shotgun
Semi-automatic shotgun

References

External links

 Image of the Cobray/SWD Ladies Home Companion
 Combined Systems Current manufacturer of Striker Shotguns in the US.

Post–Cold War weapons of South Africa
Cold War firearms of South Africa
Police weapons
Revolver shotguns
Shotguns of South Africa